James Patrick (Jim) Walsh (born 1953) is an American organizational theorist, and professor of Business Administration at the , noted for his contributions in the field of organizational memory and organizational learning. With Ungson (1991) he provided the first integrative framework for thinking about organizational memory.

Biography 
Walsh obtained his BA at the University at Albany, SUNY in 1975 and his MA two years later from Columbia University in 1977. In 1980 he obtained a second MA from the University of Chicago and in 1985 he received his PhD at Northwestern University. 

Walsh started his academic career in 1984 as adjunct assistant professor at the Amos Tuck School of Business Administration at Dartmouth College, and worked his way up to assistant professor in 1985, associate professor in 1989 and associate professor granted tenure in 1991. In 1991 Walsh moved to the University of Michigan, where he started as Associate Professor and was appointed Professor in 1996. In 1999 he was also appointed Gerald and Esther Carey Professor of Management and in 2009 Arthur F. Thurnau Professor. 

Over the years he has been a  Visiting Professor at the Hong Kong University of Science and Technology (1997), the Australian Graduate School of Management (2006), the Charles H. Lundquist College of Business (2012), the University of Western Australia Business School (2013), the Koç University Graduate School of Business (2013) the Vlerick Business School in Belgium (2013), INSEAD (2013), and the University of Pretoria (2019). From 2015 to 2019 he was also appointed Extraordinary Professor at the University of Pretoria, and in 2012 was elected Fellow at the Centre for Business Ethics, Gordon Institute of Business Science in Johannesburg, South Africa.

Since the 1980s Walsh has published numerous articles concerning topics such as the state of his profession, corporation in society, corporate governance, managerial and organizational cognition, and on other interests.

In 2013 the Academy of Management awarded Walsh the Academy of Management Career Achievement Award, Distinguished Service Award, and in 2020 the Distinguished Scholar Award, Managerial and Organizational Cognition Division. In 2017 the International Humanistic Management Association awarded him the Leadership in Humanistic Management award, and the University of Michigan awarded him the Victor L. Bernard Teaching Leadership Award.

Selected Publications

Books 
 Paul Shrivastava, James P. Walsh, Anne S. Huff (eds.). Organizational learning and strategic management. Advances in Strategic Management. Volume 14. Greenwich, CT: JAI Press, 1999.
 Margolis, Joshua Daniel, and James P. Walsh. People and profits?: The search for a link between a company's social and financial performance. Psychology Press, 2001
 Walsh, J.P. and Brief, A. P. (eds.) Academy of Management Annals. Mahwah, NJ: Lawrence Erlbaum and Associates. 2007-2011.

Articles, a selection 
 Walsh, James P. "Top management turnover following mergers and acquisitions." Strategic management journal 9.2 (1988): 173-183.
 Walsh, James P; Ungson, Gerardo Rivera (1991). "Organizational Memory". The Academy of Management Review. 16 (1): 57–91
 Walsh, James P. "Managerial and organizational cognition: Notes from a trip down memory lane." Organization science 6.3 (1995): 280-321.
 Margolis, Joshua D. and James P. Walsh. "Misery loves companies: Rethinking social initiatives by business." Administrative science quarterly 48.2 (2003): 268-305.
 Margolis, Joshua D., Hillary Anger Elfenbein, and James P. Walsh. "Does it pay to be good... and does it matter? A meta-analysis of the relationship between corporate social and financial performance." SSRN Electronic Journal, 2009. 1-68. https://doi.org/10.2139/ssrn.1866371
 Donaldson, Thomas, and James P. Walsh. "Toward a theory of business." Research in Organizational Behavior 35 (2015): 181-207.

References

External links 

 Jim Walsh at Michigan Ross website
 James P. Walsh at lsa.umich.edu
 James P. Walsh at Society for Progress webiste
 Organizational Memory (Walsh Ungson), at 12Manage.com

1953 births
Living people
American organizational theorists
University at Albany, SUNY alumni
Columbia University alumni 
Northwestern University alumni
Dartmouth College faculty
University of Michigan faculty